is a Japanese name. It may refer to:

Places

 Nakashima District, Aichi, former district in Japan, now part of Inazawa, Aichi.
 Nakajima, Ehime, former town in Japan
 Nakajima, Fukushima, a village in Japan
 Nakajima, Ishikawa, former town in Japan

Other uses
 Nakajima (surname), a Japanese surname
 Nakajima Aircraft Company, a prominent Japanese aircraft manufacturer throughout World War II
 Nakajima USA, a plush toy company
 Nakajima Racing, a Super Formula and Super GT car racing team